Come and Get It is the fourth album from Boston-based Ska band Westbound Train.  It is their second release for Hellcat Records. It was released on April 21, 2009.

Track listing

References

External links 
 Band Website

2009 albums
Westbound Train albums